The 2005 (Dec) Betfred Premier League was a professional non-ranking snooker tournament that was played from 15 September to 4 December 2005.

Ronnie O'Sullivan won in the final 6–0 against Stephen Hendry.


Prize fund 
The breakdown of prize money for this year is shown below:
Winner: £50,000
Runner-up: £25,000
Semi-final: £12,500
Frame-win: £1,000
Century break: £1,000
Total: £250,000

League phase

Top four qualified for the play-offs. If points were level then most frames won determined their positions. If two players had an identical record then the result in their match determined their positions. If that ended 3–3 then the player who got to three first was higher. (Breaks above 50 shown between (parentheses), century breaks shown in bold.)

 15 September – Plymouth Pavilions, Plymouth, England
 Ding Junhui 4–2 Jimmy White → 22–74 (58), 23–79, 58–48, (83)-24, 84–0, (61) 79–31
 Ronnie O'Sullivan 3–3 Stephen Hendry → 50–57, (104) 108–11, 63–58, 0–79, (125)-8, 23–67
 22 September – The Dome, Doncaster, England
 Jimmy White 3–3 Shaun Murphy→ 0–124 (92), 64–54 (53), 33–81 (55), (50) 55–12, 29–70, (76)-7
 Stephen Maguire 3–3 Ding Junhui → 76–38, (50) 99–0, 6–118 (80), 45–72 (63), 26–64, 76–40
 29 September – The Anvil, Basingstoke, England
 Stephen Hendry 3–3 Ding Junhui → 1–119 (112), (92) 100–0, 45–78 (74), 69–14, (123)-14, 13–76
 Jimmy White 4–2 Steve Davis → 65–35, (54,52) 106–0, 71–7, 57–22, 58–66, 6-(71)
 6 October – AECC, Aberdeen, Scotland
 Shaun Murphy 3–3 Ding Junhui → (84)-0, 58–21, 0-(126), (58)-68, (62) 73–1, 0–134 (114)
 Stephen Hendry 4–2 Steve Davis → (75) 125–0, 0–128 (103), (61) 76–1, (88)-0, 17-(69), (110) 114–1
 20 October – Assembly Rooms, Derby, England
 Stephen Hendry 5–1 Jimmy White → (94)–0, 63–45, (59) 70–2, 12–71 (50), (57) 94–0, 74–8
 Ronnie O'Sullivan 6–0 Stephen Maguire → (83)-0, 86–42, (76)-30, (131)-7, (51) 86–12, (74)-5
 27 October – Fairfield Halls, Croydon, England
 Stephen Maguire 2–4 Shaun Murphy → (56) 66–13, 0–57, 40–78, 73–35, 36–69 (65), 22–72
 Ronnie O'Sullivan 5–1 Steve Davis → (60) 86–13, (87)-19, 8–81 (55), 77–49, (101)-0, 65–24
 3 November – Grimsby Auditorium, Grimsby, England
 Steve Davis 3–3 Shaun Murphy → 68–51, 3–65, (117) 126–1, 28–65 (63), (95) 96–19, 0-(125)
 Ronnie O'Sullivan 5–1 Jimmy White → (60) 105–0, 66–38, 0–71, (54) 72–5, (64) 81–1, (64) 71–0
 10 November – Magnum Centre, Irvine, Scotland
 Stephen Hendry 4–2 Shaun Murphy → 59–40, 1-(82), 73–26, (104)-0, 25-(75), (79)-0
 Jimmy White 3–3 Stephen Maguire → 59–15, 65–25, (60) 64–32, 38–67 (62), 33–71, 18–80
 17 November – Glades Arena, Kidderminster, England
 Stephen Maguire 2–4 Steve Davis → 29–77, 48–9, 18–67, 50–87, 66–53, 37–72 (51)
 Ronnie O'Sullivan 3–3 Ding Junhui → 4–63, (100) 131–0, 46–9, 0–(116), (53) 57–78 (50), 64–57
 24 November – St David's Hall, Cardiff, Wales
 Steve Davis 4–2 Ding Junhui → 67–6, 32–67 (51), 68–59, 69–25, 63–35, 9-(101)
 Stephen Hendry 2–4 Stephen Maguire → 7–120 (108), 59–26, 2–68, 0–91 (50), 84–35, 7–77
 Ronnie O'Sullivan 5–1 Shaun Murphy → 42–64, 88–45, (92)-0, (68) 83–43, (129) 137–0, 71–25

Play-offs 
3–4 December – G-Mex, Manchester, England

* (136)–0, (100) 105–1, (66)–72 (66), 0–103 (60), 50–75, (116) 122–0, (134)–0, (85)–0
** 43–88, 98–36, 62–21, (57) 67–26, (60) 97–0, 13–(89), (61) 76–0
*** (97)–6, 62–60, 73–29, 88–0, 65–41, 65–51

Century breaks

136, 134, 131, 129, 125, 116, 104, 101, 100, 100  Ronnie O'Sullivan
126, 116, 114, 112, 101  Ding Junhui
125  Shaun Murphy
123, 110, 104  Stephen Hendry
117, 103  Steve Davis
108  Stephen Maguire

References

2005 2
Premier League 2006
Premier League Snooker 2006